The discography of Spanish recording artist Ana Guerra consists of one studio album, one compilation album, one extended play, six singles, and two promotional single.

Compilation albums

Studio albums

Extended plays

Singles

Collaborations 
2018: «El mundo entero» with Agoney, Raoul Vázquez, Aitana and Lola Índigo

2019: «Desde que te vi» with David Bustamante

2019: «El viajero (Remix) » with Nabález and Yera

2019: «Acepto milagros» with Tiziano Ferro

2020: «Robarte el corazón» with Bombai

2020: «Dos segundos» with Huecco

2020: «Los amigos no se besan en la boca» with Lasso

2020: «¡Contigo siempre es Navidad!» with Raphael, Bely Basarte, María Parrado, Cepeda, Antonio José and Miriam Rodríguez

2021: «Peter Pan» with David Otero

2022: «Voy a pensar en ti» with Fran Perea

Other charted songs

References

Discographies of Spanish artists